{{Infobox writer 
| image            = Paul Ormonde.jpg
| caption          = Paul Ormonde ca. 1975
| birth_name       = Paul Ormonde
| birth_date       = 
| birth_place      = Sydney, Australia
| death_date       = 
| occupation       = Journalist and author
| education        = 
| period           = 
| movement         = 
| notableworks     = The Movement (1972)Santamaria (2000)''A Foolish Passionate Man' (1984)Daniel Mannix (1984)
| spouse           = Marie Ormonde (nee Kilmartin)
| children         = 3
| signature        = 
}}Paul Ormonde (born 7 February 1931) is an Australian journalist and author who wrote for The Herald (Melbourne) and the Catholic Worker. He is a member of the post-Labor split Catholic group which opposed B. A. Santamaria and "The Movement", later the National Civic Council. He was particularly interested in links between political and religious affairs, specifically the Catholic Church and the Australian Labor Party. Ormonde was associated with the Catholic peace movement Pax Christi and the anti-Vietnam War movement of the 1960s and 1970s.

Early life

Ormonde was born in Sydney to James Patrick Ormonde, a New South Wales senator from 1958 until his death in 1970, and Margaret May Ormonde (née Fraser). He grew up in a family of journalists and Australian Labor Party activists. Originally his father was a journalist with the Labor Daily. In his youth, Ormonde was subject to the daily political conversations about Jack Lang and the Lang Labor party. His father supported Lang until 1939, when he reversed his support and threw in his lot with the anti-Lang and anti-communist Labor Party. Ormonde followed his father in the journalistic profession. He was 28 when his father was elected to the Senate.

Journalistic career
Ormonde completed journalistic training at The Daily Telegraph (Sydney) in the early 1950s before moving to Melbourne where he worked as reporter, sub-editor and feature writer on the Sun News-Pictorial and The Herald. He was also public relations officer for Radio Australia in the 1960s before returning to newspaper journalism. Much of his political and religious writing appeared in the Catholic Worker, an independent lay journal, where he was a member of the editorial committee from 1959 until the journal ceased publication in 1976.
 
In 1967 he became foundation chairman of Pax Christi, a group of Catholics who formulated policies on peace and war, which were oftentimes in conflict with the prevailing views of church authorities in Australia. After the 1968 convention of Pax Christi, he edited and wrote a contribution for the book Catholics in  Revolution.

He has since written for the Jesuit publication Eureka Street and Online Catholics. Ormonde's exposure of the tactics of The Movement invited ferocious attacks from its members and the Catholics who believed in its goals and modus operandi.

Public relations work
Between 1982 and 1992 he was head of public affairs for Carlton & United Breweries. On leaving CUB he set up his own public relations consultancy.

Semi-retirement
Since 1992 he has concentrated on commissioned reviews and commentaries, particularly for The Age, and The Sydney Morning Herald. Notable subjects during this period include articles on the life of the melbourne  publisher Lloyd O'Neil (founder: Lansdowne Press), on the catholic intellectual Niall Brennan (Obituary 2005), the correspondence of B.A. Santamaria (2007) and Jeffrey Archer's book The Gospel According to Judas (2007).

Books
Ormonde is the author of a number of books including:

The Movement.
DESCRIPTION:(The Movement) "saved Australia" from the "red menace", fought the "yellow peril", started the rift that split the Labor Party and the Catholic Church, turned layman against Bishop, and caused the greatest scandal in the history of Catholicism in Australia. This body of Catholics, acting with the moral and financial support of the bishops, secretly operated in one of the country’s largest political parties and most of the country’s major industrial unions. The movement damaged the credibility of the Church and the condition of Australian democracy.

A Foolish Passionate Man (biography of Jim Cairns)
DESCRIPTION:James Ford Cairns (4 October 1914 - 12 October 2003), Australian politician, was prominent in the Labor movement through the 1960s and 1970s, and was briefly Deputy Prime Minister in the Whitlam government. He is best remembered as a leader of the movement against Australian involvement in the Vietnam War, for his affair with Junie Morosi and for his later renunciation of conventional politics. He was also a prominent economist, and a prolific writer on economic and social issues.

Santamaria: The Politics of Fear, (Paul Ormonde Ed.)
DESCRIPTION:''Santamaria's whole life was a testimony to his belief that the ways of the world – whether with invincible military might, twisted propaganda, or the manipulation of people's most bigoted fears and prejudices – provided the only realistic defence of Catholic truth, as he understood it, against worldly enemies.

Ormonde edited the book and wrote the last chapter of James Griffin's:Daniel Mannix, Beyond the Myths'''.
DESCRIPTION:(This) biography is unique for exposing the Archbishop's human flaws, previously avoided or brushed over by other biographers. Giving Mannix credit for his many achievements, Griffin analyses controversies such as conscription in the Great War, State Aid for Catholic schools and his association with entrepreneur John Wren.

References

Australian political journalists
20th-century Australian journalists
20th-century Australian non-fiction writers
1931 births
Living people